Francis Joseph "Monk" Bonasorte (March 11, 1957 – November 19, 2016) was an All-American college football player and associate athletic director at Florida State University. After an accomplished playing career with the Seminoles, he worked in various semi-pro sports leagues before returning to Florida State, initially to head the school's Varsity Club. He joined the athletic department in 2008, eventually rising to become the "de facto athletic director" for the football program. He was diagnosed with brain cancer in October 2015, and died in November of the following year.

Playing time
Bonasorte played for Florida State Seminoles from 1977 until 1980, including starring on the 1979 team which went undefeated during the regular season. He held the school's career (15) and season (8 in 1979) interception records until both marks were eclipsed by Terrell Buckley in 1991. Bonasorte was a two-time All-American and was inducted into Florida State's Hall of Fame in 1995.

After his college career, Bonasorte worked as a scouting coordinator for the Jacksonville Bulls of the United States Football League. He later worked as the vice-president and general manager of the Tallahassee Thunder of the af2 football league. In 2003, after the Thunder ceased operations, he took a job as the executive director of the FSU Varsity Club for former Florida State athletes. As of that time, he was married and had two children.

A member of Florida State's All-Time football team as named by Athlon Magazine, he earned four varsity letters (1977–80), played in the 1977 Tangerine Bowl and two Orange Bowls (1980 and 1981) and was inducted into the FSU Athletics Hall of Fame in 1995 as one of the top defensive backs in school history. He ranks second in school history with 15 interceptions while his eight interceptions in 1979 ranks as the second highest single season total in school history.

Bonasorte earned All-America Third Team honors in 1979 by the Associated Press and All-America Second Team honors from Football News in 1980.

Bonasorte starred on one of the toughest defensive units in Florida State history in 1979. He led the nation in interceptions for the majority of the 1979 season and finished with eight to rank fourth nationally and set a Seminole record for interceptions in a season. The Seminoles ranked sixth nationally and fifth nationally during his junior and senior seasons respectively.

Career
Bonasorte spent seven years working with the Elmont Sports Group. He served as the marketing director for two seasons for the Tallahassee Scorpions of indoor professional league. He served as the director of marketing for the East Coast Hockey league Tallahassee Tiger Sharks (1997–99) and served as the Vice-present and General Manager for the Tallahassee Thunder of the Arena Football league (1999–2003).

Bonasorte joined the Florida State athletics department executive staff in 2008 after a 13-year career as the president and executive director of the Florida State University Varsity Club. He was considered one of the most beloved people in the administration, and his death has been cited as a factor in the decline of the football program.

Personal
Bonasorte overcame personal challenges early in his adult life, spending six months in jail after pleading guilty in 1987 charges of cocaine distribution. Bonasorte and his wife Beverly, have two sons: T.J. and Rocky. He died on November 19, 2016 at the age of 59 from brain cancer. He was a native of Pittsburgh, PA.

References

1957 births
2016 deaths
American football cornerbacks
Florida State Seminoles football players
American people of Italian descent
American people convicted of drug offenses
Deaths from brain cancer in the United States